Sir Thomas Parker (1595 – 31 May 1663) of Ratton was an English landowner and politician who sat in the House of Commons between 1626 and 1656. He was elected MP for Hastings in 1626, Seaford in 1641, Sussex in 1656 and was knighted in 1617.

He was the eldest son and heir of Sir Nicholas Parker (1547 – 1620) of Ratton and his third wife, Catherine Temple, daughter of Sir John Temple of Stowe, Buckinghamshire.

He married, in 1618, Philadelphia Lennard, daughter of Henry Lennard, 12th Baron Dacre and Chrysogona Baker, daughter of Sir Richard Baker of Sissinghurst. Their children included:
George Parker
Grace Parker
Philadelphia Parker
Rachel Parker
Catherine Parker
Anne Parker
Margaret Parker

Lady Parker died 12 January 1662. He died 31 May 1663 and was buried at Willingdon.

Notes

Sources

External links

 Llewellyn, Nigel. East Sussex Church Monuments - 1530 to 1830 - Archive of Photographs: Willingdon, St. Mary the Virgin at sussexrecordsociety.org

English MPs 1626
English MPs 1640–1648
English MPs 1656–1658
1595 births
1663 deaths
People from Willingdon
People from Eastbourne
Knights Bachelor